Nadezhda Konstantinovna Muravyova (born June 30th, 1980 in Bratsk, Russia) is a Russian team handball player, playing on the Russian women's national handball team. She won a gold medal with the Russian winning team in the 2007 World Women's Handball Championship. At the 2008 European Women's Handball Championship in Macedonia, she received a bronze medal, where she was also named "Best Defense Player".

She competed at the 2011 World Women's Handball Championship in Brazil, where the Russian team placed 6th.

Life and career 
Nadezhda Muravyova started with gymnastics before moving to handball later in her life. She started her handball training at the age of 13 in Akwa Volgograd. Her first coach was Vladimir Fedorovic Civikov. She played for AKWA from 1996-2002. Since 2002, she has played with HC Lada Togliatti.

Awards 

 1998 - won a bronze medal in the European Junior Handball Championship in Slovakia
 1998 - won a bronze medal in the Russian league
 1999 - won the Russian Championship alongside her team, Akwa Volgograd
 2000 - won a bronze medal in the European Handball Championship in Romania
 2000 - won the Russian Championship alongside her team, Akwa Volgograd
 2001 - won the Russian Championship alongside her team, Akwa Volgograd
 2001 - winner of the World Women's Handball Championship
 2003 - won the Russian Championship alongside her team, HC Lada Togliatti
 2004 - won the Russian Championship alongside her team, HC Lada Togliatti
 2005 - won the Russian Championship alongside her team, HC Lada Togliatti
 2007 - won the silver medal with HC Lada Togliatti in the Russian Championship
 2007-  winner of the World Women's Handball Championship
 2008 - won a bronze medal on European Handball Championship in Fyr Macedonia
 2009 - winner of the World Women's Handball Championship

References

Russian female handball players
1980 births
Living people
Handball players at the 2012 Summer Olympics
Olympic handball players of Russia
People from Bratsk
Sportspeople from Irkutsk Oblast